Erhard Raus (8 January 1889 – 3 April 1956) was a general in the Wehrmacht of Nazi Germany during World War II. He commanded the 6th Panzer Division during the early years of the war on the Eastern Front before taking army and army group commands. Raus was one of three former Austrians who rose to the rank of Generaloberst (Colonel General) within the German Wehrmacht. The other two were Alexander Löhr and Lothar Rendulic.

Biography

At the age of 18, Raus enrolled in the Austro-Hungarian officer school in Brno, later being stationed in Cormòns. During the First World War he experienced combat on the Eastern Front, in southern Poland, where he commanded a company of Bicycle infantry.

At the end of First World War, he was included in the newly formed Austrian army, first as the commander of the Vienna bicycle infantry battalion, later as a tactician at the military academy.

After the annexation of Austria to Germany in 1938, he transferred allegiance to the German military, becoming the military attaché of the German embassy in Rome.

At the outbreak of Second World War, he was recalled to active duty.

On 7 September 1941, during Operation Barbarossa, Raus was appointed the acting commander of the 6th Panzer Division. On 15 September, the 6th Panzer Division, minus its artillery, was transferred to Army Group Centre to take part in Operation Typhoon, the advance onto Moscow. On 11 October he was awarded the Knights Cross. Raus's unit was transferred to the LVI Panzer Corps.

In early April, the 6th Panzer Division was transferred to France to refit and rest; Raus was appointed the commander of the division on 29 April. In mid-November 1942, the division left France for the Soviet Union. Following the failure of Operation Citadel (the Kursk offensive), he organized the withdrawal of Axis units across the Dnieper river. On 10 December 1943 he was appointed acting commander of the Fourth Panzer Army. Several days later he moved the divisions across the river as well as thousands of plundered cattle and horses. Raus commanded the 1st Panzer Army, then the 3rd Panzer Army (August 1944 – March 1945) which included the III SS Panzer Corps, XI SS Army Corps and Corps Group Tettau (early March 1945).

After the war, Raus wrote and co-wrote a number of books and publications focusing on strategic analysis of the tank tactics used by his forces on the Eastern Front.

Raus died on 3 April 1956. He was buried in Vienna with full military honors on 6 April.

Awards
Iron Cross (1939)  2nd Class (29 June 1941) & 1st Class (6 July 1941)
German Cross in Gold on 14 February 1943 as Generalmajor and commander of the 6. Panzer-Division
Knight's Cross of the Iron Cross with Oak Leaves
 Knight's Cross on 11 October 1941 as Oberst and commander of the 6. Schützen-Brigade
Oak Leaves on 22 August 1943 as General der Panzertruppe and commanding general of the XI. Armeekorps

Works
Panzer Operations: The Eastern Front Memoir of General Raus, 1941–1945 (with Steven H. Newton), 
 Peculiarities of Russian warfare (German report series, 1949), Tactics in unusual situations (Small unit tactics, 1951), 
 Improvisations and field expedients: Their use as instruments of command (1951), 
 Effects of climate on combat in European Russia (German Report Series, CMH Pub 104-6, 1952)The Pomeranian battle and the command in the east (1952) 
 Strategic deceptions (Deceptions & Cover Plans Project # 29, 1948), 

References

Citations

Bibliography

 Heuer, Gerd F.: Die Generalobersten des Heeres. Inhaber höchster deutscher Kommandostellen 1933–1945. Rattstatt: Moewig 1988. 
 
 Panzer Operations: The Eastern Front Memoir of General Raus, 1941–1945'' (with Steven H. Newton)

1889 births
1956 deaths
People from Olbramovice (Znojmo District)
People from the Margraviate of Moravia
Moravian-German people
Austro-Hungarian military personnel of World War I
Austrian prisoners of war
Recipients of the Gold German Cross
Recipients of the Knight's Cross of the Iron Cross with Oak Leaves
Colonel generals of the German Army (Wehrmacht)
Austro-Hungarian Army officers
World War II prisoners of war held by the United States
Austrian military personnel of World War II
Military attachés
Austrian military historians